Psilocybe araucariicola is a species of psilocybin mushroom found in Brazil, where it grows on decayed Araucaria angustifolia wood in the  Floresta Nacional de São Francisco de Paula in Rio Grande do Sul.

See also
List of psilocybin mushrooms
List of Psilocybe species

References

Entheogens
Psychoactive fungi
araucariicola
Psychedelic tryptamine carriers
Fungi described in 2013
Fungi of South America